Poyen School District 1  is a school district in Grant County, Arkansas.

References

External links
 

School districts in Arkansas
Education in Grant County, Arkansas